Nathan ben Abraham, known also by the epithet President of the Academy in the Land of Israel (died ca. 1045 – 1051), was an 11th-century rabbi and exegete of the Mishnah who lived in Ramla, in the Jund Filastin district of the Fatimid Caliphate. He was the author of the first known commentary covering the entire Mishnah.

Biography   
A critical analysis of the time-frame in which the author of the Judeo-Arabic Mishnah commentary lived places him in the early 11th century. Assaf suggests that he was Rabbi Nathan the second, the son of Rabbi Abraham who was called the Pious, a contemporary of Rabbi Abiathar, who served in the geonate of the Land of Israel in 1095 CE. This view has been rejected by more recent scholars, such as Gil (1983), Friedman (1990), Danzig (1998), Amar (2011) and Fox (1994), who put him two generations earlier. In around 1011, Nathan travelled to Qayrawan, to attend to his family inheritance, and while there he studied under the illustrious Rabbi Hushiel ben Elhanan, one of the greatest Jewish scholars of the time. During this time he would travel to Fustat (Old Cairo), in Egypt, where he had certain business engagements, and where it was that he'd meet his future wife, the daughter of Mevorakh ben Eli, a wealthy citizen of Fustat. Nearing the age of forty, he returned to his native Palestine and, after settling in Ramleh where he vied with a certain gaon Solomon ben Judah of Jerusalem between the years 1038 and 1051 over the position of gaon, he was eventually appointed the Av Beit Din (President of the court) in Palestine, a position only second to that of the gaon, and which post he held until his death. During his years of public service, Rabbi Nathan had garnered the support and backing of Diaspora communities, although Solomon ben Judah had secured the backing of the local community, as well as the Fatimid governor of Ramleh. In Palestine, he compiled a commentary on the Mishnah, which commentary enjoyed widespread circulation in the Jewish world in the late 12th and early 13th centuries.

Commentary
Rabbi Nathan's work is one of the first known commentaries of the Mishnah, ranking with that of Rabbi Hai Gaon's commentary on Seder Taharot in the Mishnah (and is the oldest existing commentary encompassing the entire Six Orders of the Mishnah). Scholars have ascribed this commentary a unique significance, saying that by virtue of its composition in the Land of Israel, its interpretations are believed to embody an unbroken Palestinian-Jewish tradition on the meanings of difficult words. The treatise also sheds light on the diachrony of Hebrew words.

The entire work was rendered into a Hebrew translation by Rabbi Yosef Qafih, with an abridged first edition being published between the years 1955 and 1958, and the second edition in 1965. Even so, the work has not seen widespread circulation.

Anonymous copyist

Nathan's original Judeo-Arabic commentary of the Mishnah served as the basis for a later recension made by a 12th-century anonymous author and copyist, believed to be of Yemenite Jewish provenance. It is doubtful that his work would have survived, had it not been for the faithful copyist, whose innovation was to interweave in the existing text the divergent views held by several geonim and the explanations given by them for words and passages in the Mishnah. The author's introduction reads: "I found the commentaries of Rabbi Nathan, the President of the Academy, [which he made] for explicating the different language usages in the Mishnah, and I have seen fit to add thereto others besides, drawn from the commentaries of Israel's sages."
The anonymous copyist is said to have lived between 1105 – 1170 CE, making him a contemporary with Rabbi Isaac Alfasi and Nathan ben Jehiel of Rome, the author of Sefer Arukh. He is the first to introduce the work as being a commentary of the Mishnah, written by "Rabbeinu Nathan, Av ha-Yeshiva" (the President of the Academy), whom he calls "the son of Abraham ha-Ḥasīd" (Abraham the Pious). This last epithet is believed to have been an error by the copyist, who mistook its true author, Nathan ben Abraham (of the 11th century), with Nathan ben Abraham II, the grandson of the former. He then proceeds to bring down a long introduction wherein he spans the history of the written and oral Laws, writing in Judeo-Arabic and commencing with the words, qāl ğāmiʿuh (= "So said the gatherer [of the sayings of the fathers]," etc.), covering the Torah's reception at Sinai and how it was transmitted down throughout successive generations, naming some thirteen generations from the time of Israel's return from the Babylonian exile to the time of Rabbi Judah HaNasi who compiled the Mishnah in 189 CE. In all this, he never once mentions his own name, but chooses to remain anonymous. He also explains some of the terminology used in the Talmud, such as when a saying is meant to be understood as an external teaching (Baraitta) outside of the Mishnah, and when it is to be understood as a teaching strictly derived from the Mishnah compiled by Rabbi Judah HaNasi. He then mentions the redaction of the Babylonian Talmud under Rav Ashi as occurring in the year 841 of Seleucid era (corresponding with 530 CE), and names the great exegetes that followed this period, namely: the author of Halakhot Ḳetu'ot and Halakhot Pesuḳot, Rabbi Yehudai Gaon; the author of Halakhot Gedolot, Rabbi Shimon Kiara; the author of the Beramot (a term applied to the book Sheëltot of Rav Aḥai, the Gaon of Shabḥa); Rabbi Hai Gaon; Rabbi Isaac ibn Ghiyyat of Lucena; Rabbi Nissim, the author of Sefer ha-Mafteaḥ, Rabbi Samuel ben Ḥofni, Rabbi Hananel, and Rabbi Isaac Alfasi. A certain book entitled Kitāb al-Ḥāwī  ("the Compendium") is cited four times, composed by a certain R. David b. Saadiah.

Three of the author's more extensive commentaries exist for the tractates Berakhot, Shevu'ot and Avot. Since the anonymous copyist makes use of other sources in the original work bequeathed by Rabbi Nathan, it is not uncommon for him to give one explanation for a word in one tractate, but in a different tractate give a different explanation for the same word. The anonymous copyist deviated from the set order of the Mishnah, bringing down the order as follows: (Seder Zera'im) Berakhot, (Seder Mo'ed) 'Eruvin, Pesahim, Sheqalim, Kippurim, Sukkah, Betzah, Rosh Ha-Shannah, Ta'anith, Megillah, Hagiggah, Mo'ed Qatan, etc.
An early reference to Nathan ben Abraham's Mishnah commentary is brought down by Rabbi Moses ben Nahman (1194–1270), who cites the commentary in his own Talmudic commentary, saying: "Likewise, I found written in the glosses of old copies of the Mishnah composed in the Land of Israel where they explained the meaning of sippūq (Heb. ספוק) as having the connotation of adā, in the Arabic tongue, [meaning], he that grafts a tree upon a tree." The reference here is to Nathan's commentary in Tractate Orlah (1:5).

Vocabulary
Rabbi Nathan's method of elucidating Hebrew words is mostly similar to that of Maimonides' Mishnah commentary - the two often complementing each other, but differing in several key areas. A comparative study gives readers a glimpse into words that carried different connotations in that period, with occasional words whose identification can have a significant halachic bearing, depending on how they are explained. There are above one-hundred entries of plants mentioned in the Mishnah that have been identified by Rabbi Nathan. In some entries, two different explanations are given for one word, the one perhaps under the authority of another rabbinic sage.

Occasionally, Nathan ben Abraham relates to the practical usages of plants in the Land of Israel and in Greater Syria, writing, for example, that either Judas tree florets (Cercis siliquastrum) (Judeo-Arabic: דאד'י) [variant: St. John's wort (Hypericum spp.)] or violets (Viola odorata) (Judeo-Arabic: אלבנפסג) were placed in flagons of wine to impart their flavor, while rose florets (Rosa) were used to impart flavor to olive oil and to sesame seeds.

Modern Hebrew usages

In Modern Hebrew nomenclature, some of the plant identifications have changed since medieval times. For example, the Modern Hebrew word for cucumber is melafefon (a word formerly used for "melon"). The word kishū’īm (formerly "cucumbers") is now applied to zucchini squash (Cucurbita pepo var. cylindrica), a plant native to the New World. In modern colloquial Hebrew, the word ḥazeret (formerly "lettuce") is now used to denote horseradish (Armoracia rusticana). Karkūm, formerly used in Hebrew to denote only saffron, is now used also for turmeric. Lūf (formerly Arum palaestinum) is now used in modern colloquial Hebrew to denote the broadleaf wild leek (Allium ampeloprasum). Modern botanists in Israel now call Clover (Trifolium) by the name tiltan, which word formerly meant "fenugreek" (Trigonella foenum-graecum). Modern Hebrew now calls cork (Quercus suber) by the name "sha'am," although in Rabbi Nathan's day it had the meaning of "bamboo." Afūnna (der. of afūnnin) is now used in Modern Hebrew as a generic word for all kinds of garden peas, when formerly it was used strictly for chickpeas (Cicer arietinum). Cauliflower is now called krūvīt in Modern Hebrew, but which formerly was known as therūḇtor. In many cases, Arabic names are used to identify plants. Most Hebrew speakers will call the frothy relish made from fenugreek by its Arabic name, ḥilbah. So, too, the biblical hyssop, eizoḇ, is now popularly called by its Arabic name, zaatar. The Arabic word sabōn which is now used for soap (borit) is related to the Aramaic word ṣap̄ona = ܨܦܘܢܐ (soap). In other cases, Eliezer Ben-Yehuda invented new words, such as ḥatzilīm (egg-plants; aubergines), to take the place of Hebrew words long forgotten, but what Nathan ben Abraham understood as being called qīnras.

Difficult words
Some referents of Hebrew words have become so entrenched in rabbinic disputes that it is now difficult to ascertain what their original meanings may have been, such as the adjective qamūr (Hebrew: קמור / קמורה), in Mishnah Ohalot 3:7, op. cit. 5:1 and Eruvin 8:10. Rabbi Nathan (Ohalot) explains the word as meaning "plastered," (such as with gypsum and which repels water), but Maimonides explained the same word as meaning "dome-shaped." For one, the mouth of an earthenware oven which projected outside the house would be protected from the elements by virtue of its dome-like structure, while, for the other, because of its plastering. R. Hai Gaon explained it differently, saying that qamūr was an opening [of the oven or drain pipe] built at its base near to the ground so that the influx of air will cause the fire to burn well, in the case of the oven, or allow for a drainage pipe to air out.

Modern discovery
The manuscript was retrieved in ca. 1927 by Rabbi Yihya al-Qafih, from the place used by the Jewish community in Sana'a to bury old and worn-out sacred literature (genizah), within the Jewish cemetery itself on the outskirts of the city. Three copies were made of the original manuscript, before it was sold to a certain Shelomo Halevi Busani (later of Tel-Aviv), who, in turn, sold the manuscript to the Schechter Library in New York. Today, the original manuscript is housed at the Jewish Theological Seminary of America, under JTS Rab.1492. One of the three remaining copies, copied in 1930 by Qafih's grandson, was acquired by the Hebrew University library, from which a comprehensive study was made of the text by Professor Simcha Assaf who published his findings in the periodical Kiryat Sefer, in 1933.

The British Museum possesses a partial copy of Nathan ben Abraham's Judeo-Arabic commentary of the Mishnah (with only the Mishnaic Orders of Zera'im, Mo'ed and Neziqin).

Among the manuscripts and incunabula collected by David Solomon Sassoon is a two-page Judeo-Arabic copy of the Introduction taken from Rabbi Nathan's commentary, believed to have been singled-out because of its more profound nature. Rabbi Yosef Qafih has provided a Hebrew translation of the Introduction in the Mishnah published by El ha-Meqorot.

Publications
The earliest modern-day printing of Rabbi Nathan's work came in 1955, when the El Meqorot publishers of Jerusalem printed the Hebrew translation of Rabbi Nathan's commentary, yet only as a supplement to other commentaries. In 1958, the same publishers published a single edition, edited by Mordechai Yehuda Leib Sachs. A third edition was published by them in 1965. The Harry Fischel Institute in Jerusalem published the Mishnaic order of Zera'im. In 1973, Me'orot publishers of Jerusalem published an edition of the commentary, although it too was not an exclusive edition, but incorporated other commentaries.

See also
 Palestinian Gaonate
 Talmudic Academies in Syria Palaestina
 List of native plants of Flora Palaestina (A-B)
 List of native plants of Flora Palaestina (C-D)
 List of native plants of Flora Palaestina (E-O)
 List of native plants of Flora Palaestina (P-Z)
 Wild edible plants of Israel / Palestine

References

Bibliography

 

 
--()

 

(= Kiryat Sefer, X [1934])

 
 

 Danzig, Nahman (1998). Catalogue of Fragments of Halakhah and Midrash from the Cairo Genizah in the E.N. Adler Collection of the Library of JTS: the Jewish Theological Seminary of America, New York 1998, p. 47

 Fox, Menahem Zvi (1994). Ha-mishnah be-teman, kettuv-yad miperush rav nathan av ha-yeshivah, Assufot (Year Book), [8], pp. 161–167

 Friedman, Mordechai A. (1990b). "Masa u-matan bayn hakham miteman le-rabbi avraham ben ha-rambam 'al kesef ha-ketubbah ve-'al samkhut ha-masoret", Te'udah (14), pp. 139–192

 Gil, Moshe (1983). Eretz yisrael bit'kufah ha-muslamit ha-rishonah (634–1099) [Palestine during the First Muslim Period (634–1099)], Tel-Aviv, pp. 582–583
 (Available online, at HebrewBooks.org: The Geonic Commentary on Seder Taharot - vol. 1; The Geonic Commentary on Seder Taharot - vol. 2)

External links
 Rabbi Nathan's Mishnah Commentary (online), translated into Hebrew from the original Judeo-Arabic
 Mishnah
 Rabbi Nathan's Mishnah Commentary (in PDF format)

Commentaries on the Mishnah
Medieval Hebraists
Rabbis of the Land of Israel
11th-century people from the Fatimid Caliphate
11th-century rabbis
Jews from the Fatimid Caliphate
Medieval Jewish writers
Jewish Yemeni history
People from Ramla
Manuscripts of the National Library of Israel